Changzhi University (长治学院) is a full-time undergraduate publicly-run provincial ordinary college of higher learning in the People's Republic of China, located in the urban area of Changzhi City, Shanxi Province.

Universities and colleges in Shanxi